René "Bill" Domingo (28 December 1928 – 13 June 2013) was a French professional footballer who spent his entire career as a midfielder for Saint-Étienne. He was their long-term captain in the 1950s and 60s, and helped the team to their first ever domestic trophies.

Professional career
A youth product of La Combelle, Domingo joined Saint-Étienne in 1949, and became their emblematic player and captain. He captained Saint-Étienne as they won their first ever trophy, the Coupe Charles Drago in 1955. He also led the club to their first two Ligue 1 titles in 1956–57, their first Trophée des Champions in 1957 and 1962, Ligue 2 in 1962–63, and their first Coupe de France in 1962. He is the record appearance holder in the history of Saint-Étienne, with 537 games, and 423 in Ligue 1.

International career
Domingo was born in France to Spanish parents. Domingo made one appearance for the France national football team in a friendly 4-0 loss to England on 27 November 1957.

Death
Domingo died on 13 July 2013, in Clermont-Ferrand.

Honours
Saint-Étienne
 Ligue 1 (2): 1956–57, 1963–64
 Ligue 2 (1): 1962–63
 Coupe de France (1): 1962
 Trophée des Champions (2): 1957, 1962
 Coupe Charles Drago (2): 1955, 1958

References

External links
 FFF Profile
 NFT Profile
 ASSE Stats Profile
 Anciens Verts Profile

1928 births
2013 deaths
Sportspeople from Rhône (department)
French footballers
France international footballers
French people of Spanish descent
Association football midfielders
AS Saint-Étienne players
Ligue 1 players
Ligue 2 players
Footballers from Auvergne-Rhône-Alpes